Declan Hughes may refer to:

 Declan Hughes (snooker player) (born 1973), snooker player from Northern Ireland
 Declan Hughes (soccer) (born 2000), Australian footballer
 Declan Hughes (writer) (born 1963), Irish novelist, playwright and screenwriter